Phenylethylmalonamide (PEMA) is an active metabolite of the anticonvulsant drug primidone, although it is produced in a much lower concentration than phenobarbital, the other active metabolite.

References

Carboxamides
Human drug metabolites